Vantablack is a brand name for a class of super-black coatings with total hemispherical reflectances (THR) below 1.5% in the visible spectrum. The coatings were invented by Ben Jensen, who first publicly unveiled them in July 2014, and commercialised by the scientific team from Surrey NanoSystems. The original Vantablack coating was grown from a chemical vapour deposition process (CVD) and is claimed to be the "world's darkest material", absorbing up to 99.965% of visible light measured perpendicular to the material. The coatings are unique in that they are not only super-black but that they retain uniform light absorption from almost all viewing angles. Original CVD Vantablack is no longer manufactured for commercial applications as it has been superseded by Vantablack spray coatings that offer similar optical performance in key parts of the electromagnetic spectrum.

The name is a combination of the acronym VANTA (vertically aligned nanotube arrays) and the shade black.  Vantablack coatings are very costly, and Surrey NanoSystems refuses to supply them to private individuals and provides samples only for applications they deem "valid".

Properties

CVD Vantablack is composed of a forest of vertical carbon nanotubes "grown" on a substrate using a modified chemical vapor deposition process. When light strikes Vantablack, instead of bouncing off, it becomes trapped and is continually deflected amongst the tubes, eventually becoming absorbed and dissipating as heat.

CVD Vantablack was an improvement over similar substances developed at the time. Darker materials are possible: in 2019, MIT engineers developed a CVD material which reflects a tenth of the amount of light that Vantablack reflects.

The outgassing and particle fallout levels of Vantablack are low compared to similar substances, which makes it more commercially viable. Vantablack also has resistance to mechanical vibration, and thermal stability.

Development
Early development was carried out at the National Physical Laboratory in the UK; the term "Vanta" was coined some time later. Vertically aligned nanotube arrays are sold by several firms, including NanoLab, Santa Barbara Infrared and others.

The Vantablack name is trademarked by Surrey NanoSystems Limited, and has been referenced in three patents registered in the United States Patent and Trademark Office.

Applications
As one of the darkest materials, Vantablack has many potential applications, such as preventing stray light from entering telescopes, and improving the performance of infrared cameras both on Earth and in space.

In addition to directly growing aligned carbon nanotubes, Vantablack is made into two sprayable paints with randomly oriented nanotubes, Vantablack S-VIS and Vantablack S-IR with better infrared absorption than the former. These paints require a special license, a temperature of 100–280 °C, and vacuum post-processing. Surrey NanoSystems also markets a line of non-nanotube sprayable paints known as Vantablack VBx that are even easier to apply.

Artistic and decorative use 

Vantablack S-VIS, a sprayable paint that uses randomly aligned carbon nanotubes and very high levels of absorption from ultraviolet to the terahertz spectrum, has been exclusively licensed to Anish Kapoor's studio for artistic use.

Nanolab, a Waltham, Massachusetts-based carbon nanotube manufacturer, partnered with Boston artist Jason Chase to release a nanotube-based black paint called Singularity Black. During the first showing of the colour, Chase, alluding to Vantablack, stated that "its possibilities have been stunted by not being available to experiment with", and Singularity Black's release was important to create access.

The manufacturer claims that Vantablack is subject to export controls by the UK, and due to its physical requirements and thermal characteristics, the original Vantablack is not practical for use in many types of art.

Vantablack VBx2, a variant of the non-nanotube Vantablack VBx that is optimized for large area spraying, was used in a "Vantablack pavilion" at the 2018 Winter Olympics.

BMW unveiled an X6 concept with Vantablack paint at the Frankfurt Auto Show in September 2019; however, the company does not plan on producing the color on production models of the X6.

French musician Gesaffelstein used Vantablack VBx2 as part of his stage decoration during his Coachella 2019 performance.

Commercial production
The first orders were delivered in July 2014. In 2015, production was scaled up to meet demand in the aerospace and defense sectors.

See also

References

External links 
 Surrey NanoSystems, YouTube
 

Carbon nanotubes
2014 introductions
Shades of black
Chemical substances
British inventions